The European Amputee Football Championship is a quadrennial European tournament in the association football sport for amputee people It is organized by the European Amputee Football Federation (EAFF). It was first held in Istanbul, Turkey in 2017.

Competitions by year

Medals summary

See also
Amputee football
Amputee Football World Cup

References

External links
European Amputee Football Federation website

 
Recurring sporting events established in 2017
Quadrennial sporting events
Amputee football
Amputee football competitions